List of student nations at Uppsala University in Sweden. The tradition of nations at the university is practically as old as the university itself.

The list is always sorted in accordance with a time-honoured order based on the age of the diocese of the area that the nation was named after.

Active nations

Other nations
Finska nationen i Uppsala. Student society for Finnish students founded in 1998, using the same name as the historic Finnish nation.

Former nations
Adelsnationen (1768–1780). Historic nation for the nobility.
Ångermanländska nationen (1646–1800). The oldest predecessor of Norrlands nation. Merged with Västerbottniska nationen into Bottniska nationen.
Bottniska nationen (1800–1827). Merged with Medelpado-Jämtländska nationen into Norrlands nation.
Finska nationen, (1673–1835). Former Finnish student nation in Uppsala. Split from Österbottniska nationen.
Fjärdhundralands nation (?-1829). Merged with Uplands nation.
Gästrike nation (?-1811). Merged with Hälsinge Nation.
Germanska nationen (c. 1663-?). Historic nation for German students.
Hälsinge nation (c. 1646-1811). Merged with Gästrike Nation.
Livländska nationen (c. 1663-?). Historic nation for Baltic students.
Medelpado-Jämtländska nationen (1685–1827). Split from Ångermanländska nationen and later merged into Norrlands nation.
Närkes nation (?-1805). Merged with Södermanlands nation.
Österbottniska nationen (c. 1656-c. 1680). Merged with Finska nationen.
Roslags nation (?-1829). Merged with Uplands nation.
Skånska nationen (1757-?)
Södermanlands nation (1595–1805). Merged with Närkes nation.
Västerbottniska nationen (1647–1800). Merged with Ångermanländska nationen into Bottniska nationen, later Norrlands nation.
Skånelandens nation (1970s-2010) Student society founded in the 1970s by students who wanted to avoid obligatory membership in the nations. Had no membership fee and no activities and ceased to exist when membership of nations became voluntarily in the summer of 2010.

External links
In alphabetical order.
Gotlands nation
Gästrike-Hälsinge nation
Göteborgs nation
Kalmar nation
Norrlands nation
Smålands nation
Stockholms nation
Södermanlands-Nerikes nation
Uplands nation
Värmlands nation
Västgöta nation
Västmanlands-Dala nation
Östgöta nation

See also
Nations at Swedish universities

References